Quake, also known as Aftershock and The Stalker, is a United States Suspense thriller Direct-to-video, released on June 23, 1992. The film starred Steve Railsback and Erika Anderson. The film was directed by Louis Morneau.

Synopsis
Set around the events of the 1989 Loma Prieta earthquake, a young couple, Jenny (Erika Anderson) and David (Eb Lottimer), experience the horror of being terrorized by a psychotic neighbor, Kyle (Steve Railsback), in a city where panic and fear is the order of the day. A sexy female lawyer played by Erika Anderson is knocked unconscious during the earthquake. She is then kidnapped by neighbor Kyle, played by Steve Raisback. His intentions are to keep her as his prisoner and she must do whatever it takes to escape.

Also known as
 Quake {R}18+ (Australia)
 Aftershock (USA)
 Earthquake - Inferno des Wahnsinns (Germany)
 Remegés (Hungary)
 The Stalker (UK)
 Vittima di un incubo (Italy)
 Wstrzas (Poland)

External links
 

1992 thriller films
1992 television films
1992 films
American thriller films
American direct-to-video films
Films directed by Louis Morneau
1990s English-language films
1990s American films